Tatyana Dzheneyeva (born 4 October 1946) is a Soviet diver. She competed in the women's 10 metre platform event at the 1964 Summer Olympics.

References

1944 births
Living people
Soviet female divers
Olympic divers of the Soviet Union
Divers at the 1964 Summer Olympics
Place of birth missing (living people)